Naduvil is a small town  in Kannur district in the Indian State of Kerala. The town is the headquarters of Naduvil Grama panchayat.

Paithalmala is a hill station and tourist attraction near Kudiyanmala and Naduvil. Paithalmala is located at the border of Kerala and Karnataka. The Kodagu district of Karnataka is at the eastern side of Paithalmala.

It was one of the major centers of Syrian Christian migration (Malabar migration). Migration of mainly Syrian Christian families to Kudiyanmala started in the 1950s and continued until the 1970s.

Etymology
The name Kudiyanmala has a history behind it. The ruler of the Chirakkal Principality had a sister, who was accused of adultery. Accompanied by servants she was sent to Kudiattivalappu. Kudiattivalappu is located in Kudiyanmala, which is near Pottamplavu. Every 12 years Vyazhavattam, the ruler sent soldiers to kill the sons of the princess if any were born during this period. From this legend, the name Kudiyanmala was derived.

Malabar Migration which initially started in the 1920s and reached a peak in the 1950s began changing the demography from the 1950s. World War II created poverty in Travancore, which caused migration. Central Travancore, especially Kottayam district, was the focus of migration. In 1953, the Holy Mass was said for the first time in the history of this place.

Demographics
As of 2011 Census, New naduvil village had a population of 20,369 which includes 9,878 males and 10,491 females. In Naduvil, 10.3% of the population was under 6 years of age. New naduvil had overall literacy of 93.8% which constitutes male literacy of 95.8% and female literacy of 91.9%.

Geography
Naduvil is a hilly town on the eastern side of Kannur district. The terrain is undulating in nature and the extreme eastern side has forests bordering Karnataka state.

Transportation
Kerala Hill Highway (SH 59) passes through Naduvil town. It connects to nearby towns like Alakode, Karuvanchal, Chemperi, Payyavoor, Ulikkal and Iritty. The road to the east of Iritty connects to Mysore and Bangalore. 
Kerala State Highway (SH 36) is accessible from Sreekandapuram town of about 10 km away from Naduvil. 
The National Highway (NH 66) passes through Taliparamba town. Mangalore, Goa and Mumbai can be accessed on the northern side and Cochin and Thiruvananthapuram can be accessed on the southern side. Taliparamba has a bus station and buses are easily available to all parts of Kannur district.

The nearest railway stations are Kannapuram and Kannur on Shoranur-Mangalore Section.

The nearest international airport is Kannur of about 35 km away. Mangalore and Calicut are other nearby options available. Kannur International Airport will be one of the largest airports in India once the runway length gets increased to 4000m. Kannur Airport is now the largest and most advanced airport in Kerala.

See also
 Paithalmala
 Alakode

References

External links
 Kudianmala website
 Tellichery Diocese website
 tripadvisor
 naduvilnews

Villages near Taliparamba